The Tavrida Highway is a Russian-constructed highway in Crimea, designated as a federal route A291 by the Russian administration. It is a four-lane motor road with a length of 250.7 km (155.8 mi). Construction of the road began in 2017. The project's costs exceed 150 bln rubles ($2.3 bln). The construction is funded from the federal target program for the development of the Crimea and Sevastopol.

According to OpenStreetMap, the highway is partially concurrent with:
 35А-001 Граница с Украиной - Джанкой - Феодосия - Керчь, the Russian designation of the Crimean part of Ukrainian Highway M17.
 35К-003 Симферополь - Феодосия
 35Р-001 Симферополь - Бахчисарай - Севастополь

Gallery

Notes

References

External link

Roads in Crimea